Paracleros placidus, the western dusky dart, is a butterfly in the family Hesperiidae. It is found in Ivory Coast and Ghana. The habitat consists of grassy, shady areas in forests.

References

External links 
 
 

Butterflies described in 1879
Erionotini
Butterflies of Africa